Josephine Henning (born 8 September 1989) is a German former footballer who last played as a centre-back. After making her debut for the Germany national team in September 2010, she won over 25 caps and represented her country at UEFA Women's Euro 2013 and the 2015 FIFA Women's World Cup.

Club career
Henning won the Frauen-Bundesliga four times and the UEFA Women's Champions League four times while playing with Turbine Potsdam and VfL Wolfsburg in her home country. She then signed for French club Paris Saint-Germain in June 2014.

She helped Paris Saint-Germain reach the 2015 UEFA Women's Champions League Final, where they lost 2–1 to Frankfurt. Henning missed the first half of the 2015–16 season through injury then negotiated a termination of her contract in January 2016.

In February 2016, Henning attended a pre-season training camp with Arsenal in Seville, Spain. She was named as a substitute in Arsenal's 3–1 friendly win over Bayern Munich. Her transfer to Arsenal was confirmed by the club on 18 February 2016.

She returned to Arsenal for the 2017–18 season.

On 2 July 2018, Henning announced her retirement.

International career
Henning was part of the squad for the 2016 Summer Olympics, where Germany went on to win the gold medal.

Podcast
Together with her former teammate Anja Mittag she runs the podcast Mittag’s bei Henning.

Career statistics
Scores and results list Germany's goal tally first:

Source:

Honours
1. FC Saarbrücken
DFB-Pokal: runner-up 2007–08

1. FFC Turbine Potsdam
Bundesliga: 2009–10, 2010–11
UEFA Women's Champions League: 2009–10
DFB-Hallenpokal for women: 2010

VfL Wolfsburg
Bundesliga: 2012–13, 2013–14
UEFA Women's Champions League: 2012–13, 2013–14
DFB-Pokal: 2012–13

Paris Saint Germain
UEFA Women's Champions League: runner-up 2015

Arsenal
FA Women's Cup: 2015–16

Olympique Lyon
Division 1 Féminine: 2016–17
Coupe de France Féminine: 2017
UEFA Women's Champions League: 2016–17

Germany
UEFA European Women's Championship: 2013
Summer Olympic Games: Gold medal, 2016
Algarve Cup: 2012, 2014

References

External links

 
 Profile at DFB 
 Player German domestic football stats at DFB 
 
 
 
 

1989 births
Living people
German women's footballers
1. FC Saarbrücken (women) players
1. FFC Turbine Potsdam players
Paris Saint-Germain Féminine players
Olympique Lyonnais Féminin players
Women's Super League players
Arsenal W.F.C. players
VfL Wolfsburg (women) players
Expatriate women's footballers in France
Expatriate women's footballers in England
German expatriate sportspeople in France
German expatriate sportspeople in England
Germany women's international footballers
2015 FIFA Women's World Cup players
Sportspeople from Trier
Women's association football defenders
Footballers at the 2016 Summer Olympics
Olympic gold medalists for Germany
Olympic medalists in football
Medalists at the 2016 Summer Olympics
German expatriate footballers
Frauen-Bundesliga players
2. Frauen-Bundesliga players
Division 1 Féminine players
Footballers from Rhineland-Palatinate
Olympic footballers of Germany
UEFA Women's Championship-winning players
UEFA Women's Euro 2017 players